NPH USA is a non-profit organization operating in Latin America and the Caribbean to support the homes, health services and educational programs of Nuestros Pequeños Hermanos (NPH, Spanish for "Our Little Brothers and Sisters"). They aim to help children overcome poverty and become leaders in their own communities. 

NPH is fully supporting nearly 3,100 boys and girls in Bolivia, the Dominican Republic, El Salvador, Guatemala, Haiti, Honduras, Mexico, Nicaragua and Peru. An additional 3,200 community children receive scholarships, meals, health care and other support. More than 114,000 services were provided through community outreach programs in 2018.

History
In 1954, a homeless boy was arrested for stealing from the poor box of a small church in Cuernavaca, Mexico. The church's priest, Father William Wasson of Phoenix, Arizona, refused to press charges and asked for custody of the boy. Within a few days, eight more boys found a home with Wasson. He gave them a safe environment and a chance to turn their lives around. By year's end, 32 boys were in his care and Nuestros Pequeños Hermanos was born.

Wasson's devotion to the care of orphans inspired an outpouring of financial support and volunteer helpers for his humanitarian cause. NPH USA traces its roots to Wasson's family and friends in Arizona, who sent clothes, food and money. In 1965, Friends of Our Little Brothers was incorporated in Arizona as a non-profit organization. Affiliated but separate non-profit support groups called NPH USA were created in Minnesota (1986), Washington (1988) and Illinois (1999). An organization in Virginia, Our Little Brothers and Sisters (OLB&S), helped start fundraising offices in Europe as well as Canada. 

In 2005, the offices in Arizona, Illinois, Minnesota, and Washington State became regional offices of the national organization – NPH USA. In addition, new regional offices were formed in Florida and Virginia. The new offices were made possible by the fundraising support of OLB&S.

Programs
Children at NPH homes – called pequeños – are not available for adoption; instead they form a part of a larger, stable, permanent family environment at the homes, giving them a chance to focus on education and personal growth. They are taught the values of work, sharing and responsibility in a Christian environment. Each has the opportunity to finish a technical course or seek a university degree. All children are asked to give back a year or more of service to NPH. Through this act of gratitude, each graduate shares the responsibility of raising the family. 

Former pequeños are educators, doctors, accountants, carpenters, farmers, mechanics, artists, administrators and social workers. Some work for NPH, while others support NPH USA and NPH by sponsoring children, organizing fundraisers, or attending special events and serving as ambassadors for the organization.

NPH homes strive to be self-sufficient and most operate their own schools, clinics, gardens and farms. For example, at NPH Honduras, all of the fixtures and furniture, as well as most of the clothes and shoes used by the children, are made by pequeños in vocational workshops, while NPH Mexico produces enough livestock, fish, fruits and vegetables to satisfy most of the children's needs. What the homes are unable to provide internally is donated by supporters from around the world.

Organizational structure
President and Chief Executive Officer: John Deinhart

NPH USA is governed by a volunteer Board of Directors. In addition, each of the six regional offices has its own volunteer Board of Directors. Board members have diverse professional backgrounds and expertise, but each actively works to raise funds for and awareness of NPH USA.

The national office is located in Chicago.

Relationship with NPH
There is close collaboration and cooperation between NPH USA and NPH. NPH USA is a fundraising organization whose primary purpose is to provide financial support to raise, nurture and educate children living at NPH homes. In the process, NPH USA staff meet with NPH leadership to review programs, approve budgets, plan tours to homes, arrange fundraising events, and support other NPH activities. NPH USA representatives visit the homes in order to experience NPH programs first-hand.

Financial Information
According to NPH USA's 2018 financial statements, 78% of their financial resources were spent on programs, with 22% going to administration and fundraising.

In 2018, they raised a total of $19.1 million in donor contributions. Out of this amount, $17 million was received in the form of cash and $2.1 million in the form of donated goods – primarily medicine and medical supplies. These donations allowed NPH USA to in-turn provide NPH International with $15.3 million of funding for programs benefiting children and their families.

References

External links
NPH USA official site
Nuestros Pequeños Hermanos (NPH) official site

Organizations for orphaned and abandoned children
Charities based in Illinois
Non-profit organizations based in Chicago
Children's charities based in the United States
Foreign charities operating in Haiti
Foreign charities operating in Bolivia
Foreign charities operating in the Dominican Republic
Foreign charities operating in El Salvador
Foreign charities operating in Guatemala
Foreign charities operating in Honduras
Foreign charities operating in Mexico
Foreign charities operating in Nicaragua
Foreign charities operating in Peru